Aliiroseovarius sediminilitoris is a Gram-negative and motile bacterium from the genus of Aliiroseovarius which has been isolated from sediments from the South Sea from Geoje island in Korea.

References

External links
Type strain of Aliiroseovarius sediminilitoris at BacDive -  the Bacterial Diversity Metadatabase

Rhodobacteraceae
Bacteria described in 2013